A community of position is distinguished from a community of practice in that it tends to be more personally focused.  Communities of position built around life stages (such as teenage years, university/college student years, marriage, or parenthood) provide individuals with the opportunity to build relationships with others during that particular phase of their lives.

Related to
 Cohort study
 Community of action
 Community of circumstance
 Community of interest
 Community of inquiry
 Community of place
 Community of practice
 Community of purpose

Position